Events in the year 2020 in Saint Vincent and the Grenadines.

Incumbents 

 Monarch: Elizabeth II
 Governor General: Susan Dougan
 Prime Minister: Ralph Gonsalves

Events 
Ongoing — COVID-19 pandemic in Saint Vincent and the Grenadines

 11 March – Saint Vincent and the Grenadines confirmed its first case of COVID-19.
 5 November – 2020 Vincentian general election: The result was a victory for the Unity Labour Party, its fifth in a row; the party won nine of the fifteen seats, gaining one seat.

Sports 

 2019–20 SVGFF Premier Division

Deaths 

 23 January – Sir Frederick Ballantyne, 83, Vincentian cardiologist, Governor-General (2002–2019).

References 

 
2020s in Saint Vincent and the Grenadines
Years of the 21st century in Saint Vincent and the Grenadines
Saint Vincent and the Grenadines
Saint Vincent and the Grenadines